Nganu Leima (/ngaa-noo lei-ma) or Nganureima (/ngaa-noo-rei-ma) is the goddess of ducks and other water birds in Meitei mythology and religion. She is a sister of goddesses Khunu Leima and Shapi Leima. Legend says that all three sisters married to the same mortal man.

Etymology 
The Meitei female given name "Nganu Leima" (ꯉꯥꯅꯨ ꯂꯩꯃ) is made up of two component words. The two words are "Nganu" (ꯉꯥꯅꯨ) and "Leima" (ꯂꯩꯃ). In Meitei, "Nganu" (ꯉꯥꯅꯨ) means duck. The word "Leima" (ꯂꯩꯃ) is further made up of two component words, "Lei" (ꯂꯩ) and "Ma" (ꯃ). "Lei" (ꯂꯩ) means land or earth. "Ma" (ꯃ) means "mother". Literally, "Leima" (ꯂꯩꯃ) can be translated as "Land Mother" or "Mother Earth". But in general context, "Leima" (ꯂꯩꯃ) means a queen or a mistress or a lady.

Description 
Nganu Leima is described as the mistress of all the ducks and waterfowl of the world. At any moment, she could summon all the ducks and waterfowl at any place she wishes. She is one of the daughters of the sky god Salailen (alias Soraren).

See also 
 Ireima (Ereima), Meitei goddess of water
 Ngaleima, Meitei goddess of fish

References

Bibliography 
 Glimpses of Manipuri Culture - Dr. Yumlembam Gopi Devi
 The History of Manipur: An early period - Wahengbam Ibohal Singh · 1986

External links 

 

Abundance deities
Abundance goddesses
Animal deities
Animal goddesses
Arts deities
Arts goddesses
Beauty deities
Beauty goddesses
Dance deities
Dance goddesses
Fertility deities
Fertility goddesses
Fortune deities
Fortune goddesses
Leima
Love and lust deities
Love and lust goddesses
Magic deities
Magic goddesses
Maintenance deities
Maintenance goddesses
Marriage deities
Marriage goddesses
Meitei deities
Music and singing deities
Music and singing goddesses
Names of God in Sanamahism
Nature deities
Nature goddesses
Pastoral deities
Pastoral goddesses
Peace deities
Peace goddesses
Savior deities
Savior goddesses
Time and fate deities
Time and fate goddesses
Trickster deities
Trickster goddesses